Severine Lecoufle  (born 31 March 1975) is a French footballer who played as a midfielder for the France women's national football team. She was part of the team at the 2003 FIFA Women's World Cup.

References

External links
 
 

1975 births
Living people
French women's footballers
France women's international footballers
Place of birth missing (living people)
2003 FIFA Women's World Cup players
Women's association football midfielders